Angus North and Mearns was a county constituency represented in the House of Commons of the Parliament of the United Kingdom from 1950 to 1983. It elected one Member of Parliament (MP) by the first past the post voting system.

It was unsuccessfully contested in 1950 by the actor James Robertson Justice.

Boundaries
The constituency was created by the Representation of the People Act 1948, and was defined as consisting of:
The county of Kincardine inclusive of all the burghs situated therein;
In the county of Angus
The burghs of Brechin and Montrose;
The districts of Brechin and Montrose.

Redistribution
The boundaries of the constituency were unaltered at the next redistribution of seats, which came into effect in 1974. Counties and burghs were abolished for local government purposes in 1975, but parliamentary boundaries were unaffected until 1983. In that year the constituency was abolished. A new Kincardine and Deeside constituency was formed with similar boundaries.

Members of Parliament

Election results

Elections of the 1950s

Elections of the 1960s

Elections of the 1970s

References 

Angus, Scotland
Historic parliamentary constituencies in Scotland (Westminster)
Constituencies of the Parliament of the United Kingdom established in 1950
Constituencies of the Parliament of the United Kingdom disestablished in 1983